Pivka can refer to:

Places
 Municipality of Pivka, a municipality in Slovenia
 Pivka, a town in Slovenia
 Pivka, a river in Slovenia
 Pivka Basin, or Pivka Valley, a region in Slovenia

Other uses
 PIVKA, or protein induced by vitamin K absence